The 2020–21 season was Pyunik's 27th season in the Armenian Premier League.

Season events
On 20 July, Artak Oseyan was announced as Pyunik's new manager.

On 23 July, Pyunik announced the signing of Artur Grigoryan from Gandzasar Kapan, with Anton Kobyalko joining from Ararat-Armenia the following day.

On 29 July, Muhammad Ladan joined the club on loan from Sochi for the season, and Stanislav Buchnev joined from Fakel Voronezh.

On 1 August, Alexandre Yeoule signed for Pyunik after leaving Lori.

On 3 August, Pyunik announced the singing of Gor Malakyan, and a new technical partnership with Joma to supply their kit.

On 4 August, Pyunik's planned friendly match against Urartu on 6 August was cancelled.

On 5 August, Pyunik announced the signing of Artyom Avanesyan on loan from Ararat-Armenia for the season, whilst goalkeeper Andrija Dragojević left the club by mutual consent.

On 10 August, Armen Manucharyan left Pyunik to join Rotor Volgograd.

On 15 August, Pyunik announced the signing of Dramane Salou from Slutsk.

On 21 August, Pyunik announced the signing of Julius Ufuoma from Lori.

On 1 September, Pyunik announced the signings of Magomed Musalov and Artem Habelok.

On 2 September, Pyunik announced that Erik Azizyan had extended his contract until the summer of 2023, and that Levon Vardanyan had signed a new deal until the summer of 2025.

On 17 September, Pyunik announced the signing of Armen Nahapetyan on loan from Ararat-Armenia for the season.

On 29 September, the season was suspended indefinitely due to the escalating 2020 Nagorno-Karabakh conflict. On 13 October, the FFA announced that the season would resume on 17 October.

On 22 October, Pyunik's match against Noah was postponed due to positive COVID-19 cases within the Noah team.

On 2 November, Pyunik's game against Urartu was postponed due to positive COVID-19 cases within the Pyunik team.

On 9 December, Pyunik extended their contract with Serob Grigoryan.

On 13 December, Artak Oseyan left his role as Head Coach of Pyunik.
On 7 January, Yegishe Melikyan was announced as Pyunik's new manager.

On 25 January, Arman Hovhannisyan returned to Pyunik. The following day, 26 January, Pyunik announced the signing of Ihor Honchar from Alashkert, and on 27 January, Anton Bratkov joined from Metalist 1925 Kharkiv, and Robert Darbinyan from Urartu.

On 29 January, Pyunik announced the signing of Mykyta Tatarkov. The following day, 30 January, Artem Habelok left Pyunik by mutual consent.

On 1 February, Pyunik announced the signing of Herman Penkov from Lviv. Two days later, 3 February, Pyunik announced the signing of Brazilian midfielder Higor from Botafogo da Paraíba.

On 4 February, Pyunik announced the signing of Hovhannes Harutyunyan on a free transfer after he'd left Ararat-Armenia.

On 5 February, Pyunik announced the signings of Rommell Ibarra and José Balza on loan from Deportivo La Guaira.

On 10 February, Pyunik announced that Arthur Nadiryan had retired from football due to injuries, with Valeriy Boldenkov signing for the club the following day.

On 12 February, Levon Vardanyan joined BKMA Yerevan on loan for the rest of the season.

On 15 February, Pyunik announced the signing of José Caraballo from Real Santa Cruz.

On 17 February, Alexandre Yeoule left Pyunik by mutual consent, and Edmon Movsisyan moved to West Armenia.

On 20 February, Pyunik announced the signing of Oleh Kozhushko, whilst Robert Hakobyan, Arsen Sargsyan and Narek Hovhannisyan all left the club by mutual consent.

On 1 March, Pyunik announced the signing of Yevhen Budnik from Urartu.

Squad

Out on loan

Transfers

In

Loans in

Out

Loans out

Released

Friendlies

Competitions

Overall record

Premier League

Results summary

Results by round

Results

Table

Armenian Cup

Statistics

Appearances and goals

|-
|colspan="16"|Players away on loan:

|-
|colspan="16"|Players who left Pyunik during the season:

|}

Goal scorers

Clean sheets

Disciplinary Record

References

FC Pyunik seasons
Pyunik